Farid Al-Ghadry (Arabic:  فريد الغادري) (born June 18, 1954) is the Syrian-born co-founder and current president of the United States-based Reform Party of Syria, a party lobbying for regime change in Syria. Al-Ghadry has been compared to Ahmed Chalabi, the Iraqi exile who lobbied the US government to liberate his home country from Saddam Hussein.

Personal life 
Ghadry was born in Aleppo, Syria, but in 1964 his family emigrated to Beirut, Lebanon because of political turmoil. There he attended the Maristes Brothers School (Champville - Deek-el-Mehdi). In 1975, the Ghadry family emigrated to the U.S. and settled in the suburbs of Washington, D.C. Ghadry graduated from American University in Washington D.C. in 1979 with a degree in finance and marketing.

Ghadry, because of his father's work, was granted Saudi citizenship. In September 2007, Ghadry's Syrian citizenship was revoked by Syrian president Bashar al-Assad after Ghadry appeared before Israel's Knesset Foreign Affairs and Defense Committee.

Ghadry has four children. He is also known in the U.S. as "Frank Ghadry." He has served on the Board of Trustees of Norwood School in Bethesda, Maryland, and headed the Capital Campaign for Crew at St. Albans and National Cathedral Schools.

Career
Ghadry worked at EG&G Intertech Inc., a subsidiary of EG&G, a Fortune 500 U.S. defense contractor, for two years before starting his own business, International TechGroup Inc., in 1983. This company was Washington-based and produced software for the U.S. Navy to digitize paperwork on aircraft carriers. He sold this business in 1989. In 1990, he began buying antiquated Soviet computers and stripping them for gold plating. Other businesses have included Hannibal's Coffee Company, a chain of coffee shops that went bankrupt in 1996.

References

External links 
From Hama to Hamas: Syria's Islamist Policies, Farid Ghadry, Jewish Policy Center Quarterly, Sprint 2009

A Syrian Chalabi?, Gary Leupp, Professor of History at Tufts University, 24 December 2005
Exiled Syrian opposition leader to visit Knesset next month, Ha'aretz, 27 May 2007
Arab MKs attack visiting exiled Syrian leader, Amnon Meranda, Ynetnews, June 11, 2007

1954 births
Living people
American lobbyists
Syrian emigrants to the United States
Syrian exiles
Syrian Muslims
Syrian democracy activists
People of the Syrian civil war